Las Vegas Transit, also known as Las Vegas Transit System (LVTS), was a former operator of a small private bus system in Las Vegas, Nevada, United States.

History

Overview
The Vegas Transit Company (VTC) started public transportation operations in Las Vegas on August 20, 1942 with three routes and six buses by 1943. The Tanner family (as Tanner Motor Tours of Nevada) acquired VTC, then sold the franchise in 1965 to Henry Burroughs, who rebranded it as the Las Vegas Transit System (LVTS). Both LVTS and Gray Line Tours of Southern Nevada (GLT) were owned by First Gray Line West of Los Angeles, California. LVTS and GLT operated out of the same yard, on Industrial Rd near Charleston Blvd. Due to its lucrative Strip route, LVTS made significant profits for its owners. 

LVTS operated between 1965 and approximately 1993. They were bought out by the Regional Transportation Commission of Southern Nevada (RTCSNV) in early 1993 for $900,000. RTCSNV inaugurated its Citizens Area Transit service in December 1992, and for a time, there were technically two public transit systems in Las Vegas until LVTS faded away. After CAT took over, LVTS only competed with CAT only on the busy and lucrative Route #6 "Strip" for several months before being bought out. The CAT system is now known as RTC Transit.

1960s–1970s
LVTS ran a frequent and efficient service for many years during the 1960s and 1970s when the city was small; their routes covered most of the city.  At the time, they were considered a vast improvement over its predecessor, Vegas Transit Lines. In 1972, approximately 8,000 passenger trips were operated per weekday. In an article written in Bus World Magazine in 1978, they were praised as a self-sufficient bus system. However, LVTS suspended service to West Las Vegas, a predominantly black neighborhood, in 1969 after a series of racial violence incidents; the NAACP sued LVTS in 1974 stating the service was racially discriminatory. At the time, government officials also began exploring the idea of starting a public transit system to take advantage of federal subsidies.

In September 1974, LVTS experimented with a "grid" route system to expand coverage, replacing the former "hub and spoke" system at the insistence of the Regional Transit Commission. The new system expanded coverage to 75,000 additional riders, but the expected increase in ridership never materialized, and LVTS petitioned to return to the "hub and spoke" in January 1975. They then went back to the old hub and spoke route system and enjoyed an increase in ridership, as detailed in the 1978 magazine article.

As in later decades, the #6 Strip route provided the money for the other money-losing residential routes and allowed the small private transit company to turn a profit. Being a successful private bus company is an exceptional feat, as by the 1960s, virtually all transit systems in the US had been taken over by municipal governments and heavily subsidized by taxpayer dollars due to declining riderships. By 1975, LVTS was operating at breakeven or a deficit, and any expansion would have to come via public subsidy.

In 1978, LVTS operated a fleet of 26 buses, with half of them less than 5 years old. During 1976–1977, ridership rose by 21.8%. However, by 1979, an external consultant concluded the system was one of the worst in the nation, and that at least 110 buses would be required to provide adequate service.

1980s–1990s
In the early 1980s, the routes were all finally synchronized to arrive/depart at the downtown transfer center at the same time to facilitate passenger transfer, except for the more-frequently running Route #6. In turn, RTC would lease the buses to LVTS at no cost. The first RTC-purchased buses arrived in September 1981.

By the 1980s and early 1990s, the private bus system was no longer adequate and lacked both the service frequency and route coverage to accommodate the explosive growth of the Las Vegas Valley. In 1981, the State Futures Commission said that mass transit was the key issue in Clark County; a 1983 ballot proposal to fund an expansion of the system by raising sales taxes was voted down resoundingly, though. According to Las Vegas Review-Journal articles at the time, LVTS claimed that government subsidies were needed to expand the coverage area and increase frequency of service. They contended the existing coverage with limited residential routes was dictated by the more lucrative Route #6 "Strip", which generated enough profit to support the current system. The small coverage area made it extremely difficult for people to use the buses, and ridership was limited to those who had no means of private transportation.

In addition, even though Route #6 "Strip" was the busiest and its buses were packed with tourists, that route was operated with the oldest equipment, including the smallest 35 ft long × 96 in wide fishbowls. The air conditioning units on these older buses were frequently out of service. By contrast, some of the residential routes, with few passengers, were operated with the newest buses, which were city-owned, 40 ft long × 102 in wide, Grumman 870s and Gillig Phantoms.  One reason for this was the city mandated that these newer city-owned buses, which also had handicap accessibility, run on the residential areas.

A limited expansion of coverage followed the late 1970s and early 1980s, but it was too little and too late. In fact, LVTS were voted as the worst transit system in the country during one year in the 1980s  The city had outgrown the small private transit system; it was unrealistic for the city to expect a private bus company, without a taxpayer subsidy, to expand and run throughout the city based solely on its Strip revenue.  LVTS were providing a public service, but they also needed to turn a profit to continue. 

In 1990, the Las Vegas City Council rescinded the 48-year-old private franchise agreement in order to exert more control over public transportation services. That year, voters passed Question 10, which advised the state legislature to issue $100 million per year to fund mass transit in addition to a host of other transportation improvements, marking the start of what would become Citizens Area Transit. LVTS's general manager, Barry Perea, fought to keep LVTS in business and was strongly opposed to the formation of CAT, orchestrated by RTC chairman Bruce Woodbury after Clark County voters approved a quarter-cent sales tax increase in 1990 to fund a public transit system.

When Citizens Area Transit (CAT) started operating in November 1992, LVTS turned over all residential routes but clung onto the Route #6 "Strip" operation. The newer city-owned buses (Grumman 870s, GMC RTSs, and Gillig Phantoms) were returned and given to CAT. LVTS competed head to head with CAT on the Strip using their older buses from November 1992 until about April or May 1993, when they were bought out by the RTC for $900,000.  The cash fare was $1.25 for a LVTS ride and $1 for a CAT ride at the time, indicating an effort by CAT to undercut Las Vegas Transit and speed its demise. What service remained, along with a few buses, was taken over by the affiliated Las Vegas Gray Line, which continued operating for decades afterward. Eventually taken over by Coach USA and renamed Transportation Unlimited, operation of the route finally ended in 2004, being conducted with six ex-Stockton CA RTSs at the end.

Fares 
In 1971, the one-way fare was $0.50; tokens could be purchased at a discount: 20 tokens for $0.35 each, and 6 tokens for $0.40 each. Legislation was being considered (AB 311) to reduce the fare to $0.20 for senior citizens. Although fares had not risen since the start of LVTS in 1965, those original fares were the most expensive in the United States.

The cash fare was first increased to $0.70 in 1976 and was $0.75 by 1978 with no charge for transfers. In October 1983, the fare was raised again to $0.90 with a $0.15 charge for transfers, and bumped to $0.95 in 1984.

In August 1987, published fares were increased to $1 for adults, $0.50 for seniors/disabled; transfers were $0.15, good for 2 hours (no round-trips nor stopovers).

In November 1991, fares were raised to $1.25 for adults and $0.60 for seniors/disabled, transfers were held at $0.15.

Routes and operations

Structure and overview

Las Vegas Transit's route structure for most of its existence used a "spoke and hub" system, similar to a wagon wheel.  The "hub", where most routes met, was downtown Las Vegas. This was in contrast to most transit system, which generally use a "grid" system, as CAT currently does, or a combination of the "grid" and "spoke and hub" system. The reason LVTS used the "spoke and hub" system was simply to maximize coverage of area with the fewest buses. Instead of having a bus line run in both directions along the same street, most of LVTS routes were designed in one-way loops circling a section of the city before returning downtown. This method maximized the service area covered.  Furthermore, it allowed riders to go to more places, as a rider can access most other routes via the downtown hub.  However, some bus riders must circle the whole route before arriving at their destination, and in most cases, required a transfer downtown as well.

In the late 1970s, the system consisted of nine routes, numbered 1 through 10, without a Route #2. The residential routes were generally subsidized by the lucrative Route #6 "Strip/Downtown". Three of the nine routes were 24-hour routes: Route #3 "Salt Lake Hwy", #4 "Boulder Hwy", and #6 "The Strip".  Routes #3, #4, and #9 had 30-minute headways and #6 "Strip" had 15-minute headways. Unfortunately, the routes were not synchronized to meet at the same time and sometimes, a rider may have had to wait up to 45 minutes for transfer to the next bus.

By the 1980s, arrivals/departures were synchronized and the headways were increased on residential routes to 60–90 minutes, with limited operating hours, from about 5:30 AM to 10:00 PM. 24-hour service was limited to Route #6. Through the 1980s, LVTS also added several new residential routes: Routes #2 "North Las Vegas", #6A "Sam's Town/Strip", #11 "Henderson", and #12 "Spring Valley". They also added a Route #13 "Strip Shuttle", which benefited mostly the tourists on the Strip, connecting to the Las Vegas Hilton and the Las Vegas Convention Center along Las Vegas Blvd South and Paradise Road.  In the very late 1980s and early 1990s, they also added a Route #14 "Mall Hopper" to work the three major malls in Las Vegas at the time. In 1991, LVTS started the "Strip Express" with limited stops between downtown and several points on the Strip. These were used by both tourist and casino workers.

LVTS was operating 16 different routes by the time they went out of business in 1992–93; almost all routes converged downtown, with the exceptions of Routes #6A, #11, #12, #13, and #14. Only three routes, #3, #4, and #6, ran in both directions along one particular street for its whole route.  As a small, privately-operated bus system with a limited fleet, LVTS must be given credit for maximizing the service area provided.

Operations
After the route schedules were synchronized in the 1980s and onward, residential routes were run by two shifts of drivers, a morning and a swing shift. There were hour-long service interruptions on the residential routes three times a day: two times for meals (once during mid morning and again in early evenings), and once during mid afternoon to accommodate the shift change. This resulted in travel times of two to four hours for some Las Vegas Transit riders, if they were caught between these break times, as most routes required a transfer downtown.

After the Grumman 870 buses were delivered in 1982, when the newer handicap-accessible 870s broke down on a residential route, it was usually substituted by a RTS or old New Look fishbowl. Handicap passengers were told on their printed schedules to call ahead of time regarding availability of a handicap-accessible bus. The old buses, mostly the "fishbowls" from the 1960s to the 1970s, were relegated to Route #6 "Strip", along with the RTSs. This route ran between downtown and going as far south on Las Vegas Boulevard as the old Hacienda hotel. Although the air-conditioned RTSs were also assigned to the #6 Strip, the majority of equipment on this route were still the older fishbowl buses. By the 1980s, the air conditioning units on many of these older buses had failed, and ran with open windows on the extremely crowded route. During peak hours of the day, the #6 Strip buses were packed and often had to pass passengers waiting at the bus stops.

As newer buses from Gillig were acquired, some of the 870s were then also relegated to the busy Route #6 and they must have been a welcome relief as they usually had working air conditioners. However, the 870s were also required in some residential routes as replacement buses for broken-down Gilligs and also as second buses on some of the busier routes, such as Route #3 "Salt Lake Highway" (one of the few bidirectional routes) and Route #10 "University". These two routes required two buses during peak morning and afternoon hours. Also, Route #1 "Hyde Park" often needed an extra bus for second runs. Strangely enough, LVTS never published a time schedule for this second run bus on the "Hyde Park" route. It just ran 30 minutes apart from the regularly scheduled bus.

LVTS also experimented with a couple of new routes in its last years of service, including the #14 "Mall Hopper", which required two air-conditioned buses. Starting in the early 1990s, LVTS also started buying a few used and new RTSs for the Route #6 "Strip", again with working air conditioners. But, even then, because of the large number of buses required to service the busy Strip route, workhorses of the Strip fleet continued to be the good old, reliable fishbowl buses, some that were over 20 years old. In fact, LVTS ran some of the oldest buses in the USA. Because of criticism from the newspapers and city about the old, non-air conditioned buses, LVTS did fix the air-conditioning on many of the old fishbowls.

Fleet and livery 
From 1964 to about 1981, LVTS primarily operated the GM New Look (Fishbowl) Bus in both 35-foot (45-passenger) and 40-foot (53-passenger) lengths. Starting in 1981, LVTS began to supplement its fleet with leased buses which had been purchased by the city of Las Vegas: 5 GMC Rapid Transit Series (RTS) buses (1981); 12 Grumman/Flxible 870s (1982); and 13 Gillig Phantom 40-foot transit buses (1990). The Grumman 870s were used mostly on the residential routes. The RTSs and Grumman 870s were handicap accessible, while the older fishbowls were not. The Phantoms (also accessible) mostly replaced the Grumman 870s.

LVTS itself purchased new and used air-conditioned buses in the early 1990s to get newer equipment on the by-then seriously overcrowded Strip route, replacing some of the older GM New Look buses, whose air conditioning units were frequently broken. Six secondhand GMC RTS-01 buses were purchased in 1991 from San Jose, California; two new TMC RTS-06 buses were delivered in 1992.

In 1991, LVTS also bought four New Flyer D60HF articulated buses to run the "Strip Express" route with limited stops between downtown and several points on the Strip. LVTS also purchased five MCI MC-5C buses secondhand which had previously operated in Saudi Arabia. These MC-5Cs were designed with double roofs due to the hot Saudi desert sun, and thus, worked very well for the hot Las Vegas sun. They were designed to run on the "Strip Shuttle", which operated between the Las Vegas Hilton and the rest of the Strip hotels.

By the end of its operations, LVTS had a fleet of 45 buses, 30 of which were leased from the city.

Livery

In 1973, a New Look bus was named "Irving" and painted in multiple bright colors with a "happy face". According to General Manager Gary Ballinger, this was done to "inject a little fun into the idea of bus riding" and mark the beginning of an upgrade and expansion campaign. During the mid-1970s, the livery changed from a crazy color scheme of multi-color all-over with cartoonish faces (e.g. bus fronts painted w/ lips and a tongue sticking out or grinning teeth) to a more conservative and professional livery of a belt line deep orange/orange/yellow with "Las Vegas Transit" in large letters.  This more professional paint scheme lasted until the end of transit operation in the 1990s.

Roster

References

External links
Bus World Encyclopedia of Buses Book (1988)
Bus World Magazine article, 1978, Volume 1, No. 1
Ohio Museum of Transportation
Las Vegas Review Journal
Pictures of Las Vegas public buses, including Las Vegas Transit System, Citizens Area Transit, and RTC Transit
Rapid Transit Series Buses, General Motors and Beyond, 2008, Evan T. McCausland
Published LVTS Route Schedule from 11/1991
Las Vegas Transit System at CPTDB Wiki

Bus transportation in Nevada
Transportation in the Las Vegas Valley
1965 establishments in Nevada
1993 disestablishments in Nevada